"Wakamono no Subete" was released on November 7, 2007  and is Fujifabric's 10th single.

Track listing

Wakamono no Subete (若者のすべて)
Serenade (セレナーデ)
Kuma no Wakusei (熊の惑星)

Chart positions

References

2007 singles
2007 songs
Capitol Records singles